Milton Township is a township in Marion County, Kansas, United States.  As of the 2010 census, the township population was 310, including the city of Burns.

Geography

Cities and towns
The township contains the following settlements:
 City of Burns.

Cemeteries
The township contains the following cemeteries:
 Burns Catholic Church Cemetery, located in Section 33 T22S R5E.
 Burns City Cemetery, located in Section 33 T22S R5E.
 First Mennonite Church Cemetery, located in Section 29 T22S R5E.

Transportation
U.S. Route 77 highway passes northwest to southeast through the township, and follows roughly parallel to the old railway.

References

Further reading

External links
 Marion County website
 City-Data.com
 Marion County maps: Current, Historic, KDOT

Townships in Marion County, Kansas
Townships in Kansas